Bulnes Island is a small island lying  northwest of Cape Legoupil, Trinity Peninsula. It was charted by the Chilean Antarctic Expedition of 1947–48 under Capitan de Fragata Ernesto Gonzalez Navarrete, and named by him for Manuel Bulnes Sanfuentes, Minister of National Defense during the preceding Chilean Antarctic Expedition of 1947.

See also 
 List of Antarctic and sub-Antarctic islands

References 

Islands of Trinity Peninsula